Bismillah Zadran (born 4 January 1990) is an Afghan cricketer. He made his List A debut for Khost Province in the 2019 Afghanistan Provincial Challenge Cup tournament on 31 July 2019.

References

External links
 

1990 births
Living people
Afghan cricketers
Place of birth missing (living people)